Dichotomy is the third studio album by metal band Becoming the Archetype, released on November 24, 2008.  The album features guest appearances by Devin Townsend, Ryan Clark, a soprano named Suzanne Richter, and Aslan.

The album is based heavily on C.S. Lewis' Space Trilogy.

Track listing 
 "Mountain of Souls (The Ghost)" (featuring Devin Townsend of Strapping Young Lad) - 5:16
 "Dichotomy (The Tower)" (featuring Ryan Clark of Demon Hunter) - 4:25
 "Artificial Immortality (The Beast)" - 3:58
 "Self Existent (The Tomb)" - 4:18
 "St. Anne's Lullaby (The Sage)" (Instrumental) - 1:53
 "Ransom (The Serpent)" - 4:04
 "Evil Unseen (The Root)" - 4:04
 "How Great Thou Art (The Hymn)" - 4:29
 "Deep Heaven (The Awakening)") - 4:38
 "End of the Age (The Lion)" - 6:30

The band posted full album lyrics on their MySpace blog on September 11, 2008.

Personnel 
Becoming the Archetype
 Jason Wisdom - vocals, bass
 Count Seth Hecox - guitars, keyboards, backing vocals
 Jon Star - guitars
 Brandon Lopez - drums, percussion
Additional Musicians
 Suzanne Richter - guest vocals on track 9
 Ryan Clark (Demon Hunter) - guest vocals on track 2
 Devin Townsend (Strapping Young Lad) - guest vocals on track 1

References 

Becoming the Archetype albums
Tooth & Nail Records albums
2008 albums
Solid State Records albums
Albums produced by Devin Townsend